
Qixing may refer to:

China

In Guilin, Guangxi
Qixing District (七星区)
Seven-star Cave, or Qixingyan (七星岩), cave complex in Guilin
Qixing Mountain (Guilin) (七星山), in Qixing Park, Guilin
Qixing Park (七星公园), park in the vicinity of Seven-star Cave and Qixing Mountain

Elsewhere
Qixing Mountain (Shenyang) (七星山), in Xinchengzi District, Shenyang, Liaoning
Seven Star Crags (七星岩), in Zhaoqing, Guangdong
Qixing Subdistrict (七星街道)
Qixing Subdistrict, Guilin, in Qixing District, Guilin, Guangxi
Qixing Subdistrict, Mudanjiang, in Dong'an District, Mudanjiang, Heilongjiang
Qixing Subdistrict, Shuangyashan, in Baoshan District, Shuangyashan, Heilongjiang
Qixing Subdistrict, Xinchang County, Zhejiang
Towns named Qixing (七星镇)
Qixing, Luanping County, Chongqing
Qixing, Shuangyashan, in Baoshan District, Shuangyashan, Heilongjiang
Qixing, Jiaxing, in Nanhu District, Jiaxing, Zhejiang
Qixing Township, Yunnan (七星乡), Xundian Hui and Yi Autonomous County, Yunnan

Taiwan
Qixing Mountain (Taipei) (七星山)
Qixingyan (Taiwan) (七星岩), off the coast of Pingtung County in the Bashi Channel
Qixingtan Beach (七星潭海邊), a beach in Xincheng Township, Hualien County facing the Pacific Ocean